The 53rd Rifle Corps was a corps of the Soviet Red Army. It was part of the 24th Army. It took part in the Great Patriotic War.

After a brief period on occupation duty in Germany after the war ended, the 17th Rifle Division (III Formation) was returned to the Soviet Union in the Volga Military District at Yoshkar-Ola where it was reorganized as the 1st Rifle Brigade as part of the 53rd Rifle Corps. It was disbanded in March 1947.

Divisions 
 107th Rifle Division
 133th Rifle Division
 178th Rifle Division

References 

Rifle corps of the Soviet Union
Military units and formations disestablished in the 1940s